Haarbach is a municipality in the district of Passau in Bavaria in Germany.

Villages of the municipality of Haarbach

References

Passau (district)